Tsikhisdziri may refer to:

 Tsikhisdziri, Kobuleti Municipality, a village in Kobuleti Municipality, Adjara, Georgia
 Tsikhisdziri, Dusheti Municipality, a village in Dusheti municipality, Georgia
 Tsikhisdziri, Mtskheta Municipality, a village in Mtskheta municipality, Georgia